The olive-faced flatbill or olive-faced flycatcher (Tolmomyias viridiceps) is a species of bird in the tyrant flycatcher family Tyrannidae. It is found in riparian woodland and at the forest edge in western Amazonia.

The olive-faced flatbill was described by the English ornithologists Philip Sclater and Osbert Salvin in 1873 from a specimen collected in Pebas, Peru. They coined the binomial name Rhynchocyclus viridiceps. It was formerly treated as a subspecies of the ochre-lored flatbill (Tolmomyias flaviventris) but is now considered as a separate species based primarily on its very different vocalization.

References

External links
Xeno-canto: audio recordings of the olive-faced flatbill (Tolmomyias viridiceps)

olive-faced flatbill
olive-faced flatbill
olive-faced flatbill
olive-faced flatbill
Birds of Bolivia
Birds of Colombia
Birds of Brazil
Birds of Peru
Birds of Ecuador